Nur Mohammad Kandi is a village in Kurdistan Province, Iran,

Nur Mohammad Kandi may also refer to:
 Nur Mohammad Kandi-ye Olya, Ardabil Province
 Nur Mohammad Kandi-ye Sofla, Ardabil Province
 Nur Mohammad Kandi-ye Vosta, Ardabil Province